Dennis Geiger (born 30 June 1984) is a German footballer who plays as a defender, most recently for SSV Jeddeloh.

References

External links
 
 

1984 births
Living people
People from Reutlingen
Sportspeople from Tübingen (region)
German footballers
Association football defenders
KFC Uerdingen 05 players
MSV Duisburg II players
SV Waldhof Mannheim players
SV Meppen players
Regionalliga players
3. Liga players
Footballers from Baden-Württemberg
SSV Jeddeloh players